Chandrashila  is the summit above Tungnath temple in India. It literally means "Moon Rock". This peak provides views of the Himalayas, including Nandadevi, Trisul, Kedar Peak, Bandarpunch and Chaukhamba peaks. There are various legends associated with this place. According to one such legend, this is where Lord Rama meditated after defeating the demon-king Ravana. Another legend says that the moon-god Chandra spent time here in penance.

Accessibility
A bus can be directly taken up to Ukhimath from Haridwar or Dehradun or a taxi to Rudraprayag and then Ukhimath takes about 8 hours. There is no taxi service to Chopta from Ukhimath.

Chopta is well connected by motor roads with the major towns of Garhwal region of Uttarakhand state. Follow NH58 until you reach Rudraprayag and after reaching Rudraprayag follow the route to Kedarnath and take right turn to Ukhimath.  Chopta is situated 29 km from Ukhimath.  Chopta is also accessible from Gopeshwar.

The nearest railhead to Chopta is Rishikesh situated 209 km away. Rishikesh is well connected by railway networks with the major cities of India. Buses and taxis to Chopta and Ukhimath are easily available from Rishikesh.

Jolly Grant Airport is the nearest airport to Chopta, situated 226 km away in the Dehradun district of Uttarakhand state. The remaining journey has to be either by taxi or  bus. Taxis are easily available to Rishikesh, Rudraprayag, Ukhimath and Chopta from Jolly Grant Airport.

Another possible route is through Haridwar to Rishikesh, Rudraprayag then Ukhimath finally to Chopta.

Chopta distance chart
 Ukhimath to Chopta – 29 km
 Delhi to Chopta – 451 km
 Meerut to Chopta – 368 km
 Rishikesh to Chopta – 200 km
 Haridwar to Chopta – 225 km
 Pauri to Chopta – 126 km
 Dehradun to Chopta – 246 km
 Mussoorie to Chopta – 212 km
 Devprayag to Chopta – 130 km
 Tehri Garhwal to Chopta – 151 km
 Kotdwar to Chopta – 229 km
 Joshimath to Chopta – 92 km
 Srinagar to Chopta – 96 km
Kedarnath to Chopta – 64 km
 Rudraprayag to Chopta – 63 km
 Gopeshwar to Chopta – 41 km
 Badrinath to Chopta – 136 km

From Chopta it is a 6 km trek.

Trekking
Chandrashila treks are one of the most popular treks among Indian trekking enthusiasts.  The trek to the peak is 5 km. The trek route that starts from Chopta takes one to Tungnath (highest Shiva temple in the world), from here it is a kilometre long, and a steep trek. Though shorter in distance, steep climbing makes this trek rigorous.

This trek is undertaken throughout the year although during the winter season due to snowfall this trek becomes hard as road to Chopta is closed. Trekkers use a different route during this period (Deoria Tal - Duggalbitta - Tungnath - Chandrashila).

See also 
 Tungnath
 Chopta
 Panch Kedar

References

External links 

 Photos of Chandrashila
Mountains of Uttarakhand